Kokou Djaoupe (born 10 July 1968) is a Togolese football referee, who has refereed 21 games in African competitions.
 
Djaoupe became a FIFA referee in 2001. He has served as a referee in 2006 and 2010 World Cup qualifiers. He was selected to be one of the referees of the 2008 and 2010 African Cup of Nations.

He is ranked 164th of the best football referees in Africa. The referee of Togo has led 21 games in the African Cup and has competed in two Cup of Africa in the last two editions.

References

1968 births
Living people
Togolese football referees
Sportspeople from Lomé
21st-century Togolese people